Squash competitions at the 2007 Pan American Games was held from July 14 to July 19 at the Miécimo da Silva Complex in Rio de Janeiro, Brazil. There were four events, two for both men and women, with Canada (five medals) leading the competition.

Men's competition

Singles

Team

Women's competition

Singles

Team

Medal table

References
 Sports 123
 worldsquash
 squashplayer

P
2007
Events at the 2007 Pan American Games